Nields is a surname. Notable people with the surname include:

John Percy Nields, U.S. district judge in Delaware
John W. Nields Jr., lawyer, and father of some members of The Nields
Henry C. Nields, U.S. Navy officer, namesake of the USS Nields (DD-616)
Sheryl Nields, American photographer

Fictional characters:
Norman Nields, fictional character in The Junior Defenders